Paretroplus loisellei is a vulnerable species of cichlid fish from the Mahanara River basin north of Sambava in northeastern Madagascar. Until its scientific description in 2011, this population was usually referred to as Paretroplus sp. nov. "Ventitry" or included in P. damii, which it resembles. The similar named Ptychochromis loisellei is also restricted to the Mahanara River basin. The specific name honours Paul V. Loiselle, Emeritus Curator of Freshwater Fishes at the New York Aquarium and a researcher in, and campaigner for the conservation of, the freshwater fish of Madagascar.

References

loisellei
Cichlid fish of Africa
Freshwater fish of Madagascar
Taxa named by John Stephen Sparks  
Taxa named by Robert C. Schelly
Fish described in 2011